Joe Farrer is an American politician who served as a member of the Arkansas House of Representatives from the 44th district.

References

Republican Party members of the Arkansas House of Representatives
21st-century American politicians
Living people
Year of birth missing (living people)